CKBX is a Canadian radio station, which broadcasts at 840 AM in 100 Mile House, British Columbia. Owned by Vista Broadcast Group, the station airs a country format and is branded as Country 840.

History
The station's license was issued on December 15, 1970 to Cariboo Broadcasters Ltd., which owned several other stations. The license permits Cariboo to operate a new AM radio station at 100 Mile House. It was allotted a frequency of 1240 kHz with a transmission power of 250 watts. Cariboo Broadcasters launched the station in 1971.

In 1975, approval was granted for the station to increase its daytime transmission power from 250 to 1,000 watts.

On October 9, 1985, the CRTC permitted Cariboo to change CKBX's frequency from to 840 kHz and increase the nighttime power from 250 watts to 500 watts.

On October 4, 2004 at 8:00am, CKBX changed is branding from Wild Country to The Wolf, playing modern country and southern rock music.

In 2005, Cariboo Broadcasters was acquired by the Vista Broadcast Group.

In 2008, CKBX was converted to a stand-alone radio station serving 100 Mile House and area, becoming Country 840.

See also
CKCQ-FM

References

External links
 Country 840
 CKBX History - Canadian Communications Foundation
 

Kbx
Kbx
Kbx
Radio stations established in 1970
1970 establishments in British Columbia